The Albești is a river in Constanța County, Romania. In the city Mangalia it flows into the Black Sea.

References

Rivers of Romania
0Albesti
Rivers of Constanța County